The following represents the golfers who have won at least three consecutive starts in PGA Tour events. The list relates to consecutive events that they played in; they generally missed some PGA Tour events during their streak. In some cases the players competed in and failed to win non-PGA Tour events in between these events.

Sources: 4+ wins, 3+ wins

References

Win streaks
Golf records and rankings
Lists of sports superlatives
Lists of longest-duration things